Raddy Machel Hokemba Ovouka (7 December 1999) is a Congolese professional footballer who plays as left-back for Football Superleague of Kosovo club Drita Gjilan loan from Ghana Premier League clubAccra Hearts of Oak and the Congo national team.

Club career

Hearts of Oak 
Ovouka signed for Accra Hearts of Oak in January 2018. He was part of their squad during their GHALCA Top 8 competition, however he did not make any appearance. He made his official debut on 24 March 2018, starting in their 3–1 loss to Ashanti Gold during the 2018 Ghana Premier League season. He played 43 minutes before being substituted for Isaac Mensah. That was his only appearance that season as the league was abandoned due to the dissolution of the GFA in June 2018, as a result of the Anas Number 12 Expose. During the 2019 GFA Normalisation Competition, he played two matches as Hearts made it to the championship semi-final playoff. Ovouka had his breakthrough season during the 2019–20 season displacing William Dankyi from the left-back position. He started and played the whole 90 minutes in 12 matches, missing two matches within that period before the league was cancelled due to the COVID-19 pandemic in Ghana. He was nominated for the Congolese footballer of the year in 2020.

In January 2021, he extended his contract by two years. In the 2020–21 season, Ovouka was Hearts of Oak's first choice left-back in their double winning season. He played 29 league matches, scored one goal and made three assists to help Hearts in winning the 2020–21 Ghana Premier League after a 12-year trophy drought. His only goal of the season was his debut goal, which was scored on 7 March 2021 during Samuel Boadu's first game in charge, helping Hearts to a 4–0 victory over West African Football Academy. During the 2021 Ghanaian FA Cup final, Ovouka played the full 90 minutes plus extra time and scored Hearts' 8th penalty in the penalty shootout to help complete their domestic double. At the end of the season, he was considered as the best left-back in the league and was reportedly an interest for a club in the Ligue 1 alongside other clubs in Africa.

New Mexico United 
On 5 January 2022, it was announced that, as a result of a contract dispute, Ovouka would be loaned to USL Championship club New Mexico United indefinitely.

International career 
On the back of his performance in the Ghana Premier League, Ovouka received his first call-up to the Congo national team in March 2020 ahead of the team's 2021 Africa Cup of Nations qualifiers against Eswatini. He made his debut on 26 March 2021 playing the full 90 minutes in their goalless draw against Senegal in their 2021 Africa Cup of Nations qualifiers Group I.

Honours 
Hearts of Oak

 Ghana Premier League: 2020–21
Ghanaian FA Cup: 2021

References

External links 

 

Living people
2000 births
Republic of the Congo footballers
Republic of the Congo international footballers
Ghana Premier League players
Association football defenders
Accra Hearts of Oak S.C. players
New Mexico United players